Bernhard Meyer (January 21, 1885 – February 6, 1974) born in Hematite, Missouri, was a baseball outfielder for the Brooklyn Dodgers (1913), Baltimore Terrapins (1914–15), Buffalo Blues (1915) and Philadelphia Phillies (1925).

In four seasons he played in 310 major league games and had 1,041 at bats, 146 runs, 276 hits, 29 doubles, 17 triples, 7 home runs, 84 RBIs, 46 stolen bases, 158 walks, .265 batting average, .365 on-base percentage, .346 slugging percentage, 360 total bases and 31 sacrifice hits.

After retiring as a player, he worked as a coach for the Philadelphia Phillies under manager Art Fletcher. He served as a non-playing captain in 1924. He coached with the Detroit Tigers under manager Bucky Harris. He developed a reputation for his loudness as a coach for Detroit and was the subject of an article in The Sporting Life in 1929. He managed the Grand Rapids Chicks in 1945.

He died in Festus, Missouri, at the age of 89.

References

Sources

 

1885 births
1974 deaths
All-American Girls Professional Baseball League managers
Baltimore Terrapins players
Baseball players from Missouri
Brooklyn Superbas players
Buffalo Blues players
Chicago White Sox scouts
Detroit Tigers coaches
Major League Baseball right fielders
Mobile Sea Gulls players
Newark Indians players
Philadelphia Phillies coaches
Philadelphia Phillies players
People from Jefferson County, Missouri
Seattle Siwashes players
Toronto Maple Leafs (International League) players
Miami Indians players